Máté is a masculine Hungarian given name. Notable people with the name include:

 Máté Csák (disambiguation), several people
 Máté Fejes, (born 1988), Hungarian ice dancer
 Máté Fenyvesi (born 1933), Hungarian footballer
 Máté Halász (born 1984), Hungarian handballer
 Máté Helebrandt (born 1989), Hungarian racewalker
 Máté Hidvégi (born 1955), Hungarian biochemist
 Máté Katona (born 1990), Hungarian footballer
 Máté Kiss (born 1991), Hungarian footballer
 Máté Kocsis (born 1981), Hungarian jurist and politician
 Máté Lékai (born 1988), Hungarian handballer
 Máté Pátkai (born 1988), Hungarian footballer
 Máté Skriba, (born 1992), Hungarian footballer
 Máté Tóth (footballer, born 1991), Hungarian footballer for Vasas SC
 Máté Tóth (footballer, born 1998), Hungarian footballer for Szombathelyi Haladás
 Máté Toroczkai (1553–1616), fifth bishop of the Unitarian Church in Cluj
 Máté Vass (born 1990), Hungarian footballer
 Máté Zalka (born 1896), Hungarian writer and revolutionary
 Máté Bella (born 1985), Hungarian composer and university lecturer

See also
 Mate (given name)
 Máté (surname)
 Matthew (given name)

Hungarian masculine given names